This is chronological list of crime films split by decade. Often there may be considerable overlap particularly between Crime and other genres (including, action, thriller, and drama films); the list should attempt to document films which are more closely related to crime, even if it bends genres.

Films by decades
List of crime films before 1930
List of crime films of the 1930s
List of crime films of the 1940s
List of crime films of the 1950s
List of crime films of the 1960s
List of crime films of the 1970s
List of crime films of the 1980s
List of crime films of the 1990s
List of crime films of the 2000s
List of crime films of the 2010s
List of crime films of the 2020s

See also
 List of pirate films

 

 
Lists of films by genre